Harutiun Shahrigian (1860–1915) was an Armenian politician, soldier, lawyer, and author.

Better known by nicknames  Atom,, Nitra, he had a prominent role in the Armenian Revolutionary Federation (ARF) and was also a member of the Armenian National Assembly, a lawyer and author of publications on the Armenian Question. He was a victim of the Armenian genocide.

Biography 
Haruiun Shahrigian was born in 1860 in Shabin-Karahisar, Sivas Vilayet in the Ottoman Empiretoday in Turkey's Giresun Province.

Shahrigian graduated from Galatasaray High School located in Constantinople. He continued his studies at the University of Constantinople, graduating with a degree in law in 1880.

He settled in Trabzon where he worked as a lawyer from 1889 to 1895. During his career he defended Armenians imprisoned for political activity.

He was imprisoned during the Hamidian massacres in 1895. In 1897, after spending thirteen months in prison, he escaped and settled in Batumi, ultimately moving to Tiflis. There Shahrigian continued his legal career, working in association with Alexander Mantashev.

On 25 July 1897, he left to Salmas, Persia in order to coordinate the Khanasor Expedition organized by the Armenian Revolutionary Federation.

He participated in a 16–26 January 1898 congress of ARF Eastern Bodies members in Tiflis. There he served on the Potorig Committee from 1901 to 1903. Shahrgian and Avetik Sahakyan were responsible for ARF operations in the region of Baku (Voskanapat) and northern regions of Russia.

From 1905 to 1906 he organized the transportation and delivery of ammunition to front line positions to assist in self-defense efforts during the Armenian–Tatar massacres of 1905–07.

After the Young Turk Revolution of 1908 he moved to Constantinople where he participated in the Armenian National Assembly representing the district of Scutari. He was also a contributor to the newspaper Azadamard.

During the Armenian genocide in 1915 he was deported to Ayas, where he was tortured and ultimately killed in the outskirts of Ankara.

Publications 
Our Credo, Constantinople, 1910
Мarriage Questions, legal and social character, Constantinople, 1912
History of Decline of the Ottoman Empire, Turkey, 1913
Question of Reforms, Constantinople, 1914
National Constitution, Constantinople, 1914

See also 
Deportation of Armenian intellectuals on 24 April 1915

References

External links 
 Еncyclopedia of found «Hayazg»
 "Why is the Armenian Genocide commemorated on April 24?"
 Dashnaktsutyun
 F.S.L.National Academy of Sciences Republic of Armenia
 1984, Армения в политике империалистической Германии (конец XIX начало XX века), Е, 1975; The Armenian Genocide, v. 2, Munchen, 1988; О h a n d j a n ia n A, Oslereich Ungam und Armenien 1914 1918, Wien, 1988 U Օհանջանյան (Ավստրիա)U. Կիրակոսյան
 Թոեդիկը ներկայացրել է Եղեռնին զոհ գնացած 763 մտավորականի անուն
 «Հայ գրականության նմուշները 1913 թ.» ` մեզնից թաքցված գոհարները 2012/05/23
 

1860 births
1915 deaths
People from Şebinkarahisar
People who died in the Armenian genocide
Armenian expatriates in Iran
People of the Armenian genocide
Armenia–Turkey relations
Istanbul University Faculty of Law alumni